The 2018 Arnold Strongman Classic was a strongman contest that took place in Ohio, Columbus from 2–3 March 2018 at the Greater Columbus Convention Center. The Arnold Strongman Classic is the finale of the Arnold Strongman Tour and is seen as one of the biggest and most prestigious strongmen events on the circuit.

After a continuous progression in the competition, being 10th in 2012, 8th in 2013, 5th in 2014, 7th in 2015, 5th in 2016 and 2nd in 2017 Iceland's Hafþór Júlíus Björnsson won his first Arnold Strongman Classic after defeating the winner from 2017 American Brian Shaw who emerged 2nd. Russia's Mikhail Shivlyakov secured the 3rd place.

Qualifying
To qualify for the Arnold Strongman Classic athletes have to either win a sanctioned event on the Arnold Classic Tour (for example: Arnold Europe, Arnold Australia, Arnold Africa, and Arnold South America) or gain enough points to be invited through a wildcard system. Athletes that qualified (in alphabetical order/ surname) are as follows:

Matjaz Belsak (Slovenia), Hafthor Björnsson (Iceland), Jean-Francois Caron (Canada), Rauno Heinla (Estonia), Mateusz Kieliszkowski (Poland), Mateusz Ostazsewski (Poland), Jerry Pritchett (USA), Dimitar Savatinov (Bulgaria), Brian Shaw (USA) and Mikhael Shivlyakov (Russia).Reserve: Vytautas Lalas (Lithuania)

Final Results

Event 1: Bag over bar
Contestants have to throw heavy sandbags from 'a duck walk to an overhead position' over a high bar. 
Bar height: 15 feet.
Notes: 3 lifts per athlete and the heaviest weight for the win.

Event 2: Stone Shoulder
Contestants have to hoist the legendary Odd Haugen's Tombstone to their shoulder for many reps as possible.
Weight:  Odd Haugen Tombstone.
Time Limit: 2 Minutes & 30 seconds
Notes: Highest number of reps for the win.

Event 3: Timber Carry
Also known as the Frame Carry, contestants have to lift heavy barn timbers bolted together and travel up an inclined ramp.
Weight:  along a 35' inclined ramp for the fastest time to finish or else greatest distance.
Time Limit: 30 seconds.
Notes: Raw/ no straps allowed. Timber may be dropped and picked up.

^ Jerry Pritchett's time of 9.58 secs was a new strongman record.

Event 4: Elephant Bar Deadlift
Contestants are required to lift a specially designed extra whipping long bar with Arnold Schwarzenegger inscribed weight plates from a standard 9" height. The apparatus was designed and manufactured by Rogue Fitness. 
Time Limit: 60 seconds per lift
Notes: 3 lifts per athlete, weights to be submitted before each round. Heaviest lift wins. 

This was also the only instance in the history of the event (2016 - 2020), that 3 athletes pulled more than 1,000 lbs.

Event 5: Apollon's Wheels
A unique barbell made famous by the traditional strongman Louis 'Apollon' Uni, reproduced by Ivanko Barbell Company, the Axle is a replica of the original with the same bar thickness.
Weight:  For max repetitions.
Time Limit: 2 Minutes.
Notes: Reps must begin with wheels on the platform. Highest number of points win.

Final standings

References

Arnold Strongman Classic
Arnold Strongman Classic
Arnold Strongman Classic
Strongmen competitions